Sorbitan monostearate is an ester of sorbitan (a sorbitol derivative) and stearic acid and is sometimes referred to as a synthetic wax.

Uses
Sorbitan monostearate is used in the manufacture of food and healthcare products as a non-ionic surfactant with emulsifying, dispersing, and wetting properties. It is also employed to create synthetic fibers, metal machining fluid, and as a brightener in the leather industry. Sorbitans are also known as "Spans".
 
Sorbitan monostearate has been approved by the European Union for use as a food additive (emulsifier) (E number: E 491). It is also approved for use  by the British Pharmacopoeia.

See also
 Polysorbate
 Sorbitan tristearate (Span 65)

References 

Food additives
Non-ionic surfactants
E-number additives
Stearate esters